Frank Frazetta (born Frank Frazzetta ; February 9, 1928 – May 10, 2010) was an American fantasy and science fiction artist, noted for comic books, paperback book covers, paintings, posters, LP record album covers, and other media. He is often referred to as the "Godfather of fantasy art", and one of the most renowned illustrators of the 20th century. He was also the subject of a 2003 documentary Painting with Fire.

Frazetta was inducted into the comic book industry's Will Eisner Comic Book Hall of Fame, the Jack Kirby Hall of Fame, the Society of Illustrators Hall of Fame, the Science Fiction Hall of Fame, and was awarded a Life Achievement Award from the World Fantasy Convention.

Early life
Born Frank Frazzetta in Brooklyn, New York City, Frazetta removed one "z" from his last name early in his career to make his name seem less "clumsy". The only boy in a family with three sisters, he spent much time with his grandmother, who began encouraging him in art when he was two years old. In 2010, a month before his death, he recalled that:

At age eight, Frazetta attended the Brooklyn Academy of Fine Arts, a small art school run by instructor Michel Falanga. "[H]e didn't teach me anything, really," Frazetta said in 1994. "He'd come and see where I was working, and he might say, 'Very nice, very nice. But perhaps if you did this or that.' But that's about it. We never had any great conversations. He spoke very broken English. He kind of left you on your own. I learned more from my friends there."

Career

Early work
In 1944, at age 16, Frazetta, who had "always had this urge to be doing comic books", began working in comics artist Bernard Baily's studio doing pencil clean-ups. His first comic-book work was inking the eight-page story "Snowman", penciled by John Giunta, in the one-shot Tally-Ho Comics (Dec. 1944), published by Swappers Quarterly and Almanac/Baily Publishing Company. It was not standard practice in comic books during this period to provide complete credits, so a comprehensive listing of Frazetta's work is difficult to ascertain. His next confirmed comics works are two signed penciled-and-inked pieces in Prize Comics' Treasure Comics #7 (July 1946): the four-page "Know your America" is Frank Frazetta's first "solo" work, and the single page "Ahoy! Enemy Ship!", featuring his character Capt. Kidd Jr. In a 1991 interview in The Comics Journal, Frazetta credited Graham Ingels as the first one in the comic book industry to recognize his talent, and to give him jobs at Standard Comics in 1947.

For Dell's subsidiary company, Famous Funnies, Frazetta did war and human interest stories for Heroic Comics, as well as one pagers extolling the virtues of prayer and the evils of drug abuse. In comics like Personal Love and Movie Love, he did romance and celebrity stories.

He married Massachusetts native Eleanor Kelly in New York City in November 1956. The two had four children: Frank Jr., Billy, Holly, and Heidi.

In 1961, after nine years with Al Capp, Frazetta returned to comic books. He also helped Harvey Kurtzman and Will Elder on three stories of the bawdy parody strip Little Annie Fanny in Playboy magazine.

Hollywood and book covers

In 1964, Frazetta's painting of Beatle Ringo Starr for a Mad magazine ad parody caught the eye of United Artists studios. He was approached to do the film poster for What's New Pussycat?, and earned the equivalent of his yearly salary in one afternoon. He did several other film posters.

Frazetta also produced paintings for mass market paperback editions of adventure books. His interpretation of Robert E. Howard's Conan the Barbarian visually redefined the genre of sword and sorcery, and had an enormous influence on succeeding generations of artists. His cover art only coincidentally matched the storylines inside the books, as Frazetta once explained: "I didn't read any of it... I drew him my way. It was really rugged. And it caught on. I didn't care about what people thought. People who bought the books never complained about it. They probably didn't read them."

Primarily, these were in oil, but he also worked in watercolor, ink, and pencil alone. Frazetta's work in comics during this time were cover paintings and a few comic stories in black-and-white for the Warren Publishing horror and war magazines Creepy, Eerie, Blazing Combat, and Vampirella.

An advertisement for Jōvan Musk, based on his work, was animated by Richard Williams in grease pencil and paint and shown in 1978. The realism of the animation and design replicated Frazetta's artwork. Frazetta and Ralph Bakshi were heavily involved in the production of the live-action sequences used for the film Fire and Ice's rotoscoped animation, from casting sessions to the final shoot. The film was Frazetta's only work in animation, following its release he returned to his roots in painting and pen-and-ink illustrations.

Frazetta's paintings have been used by a number of recording artists as cover art for their albums. The U.S. Army III Corps adopted "The Death Dealer" as its mascot.

In 2009 Kirk Hammett, the lead guitarist for Metallica, bought Frazetta's cover artwork for the paperback reissue of Robert E. Howard's "Conan the Conqueror" for $1 million.

Later life and career
In the early 1980s, Frazetta created a gallery, Frazetta's Fantasy Corner, on the upper floors of a former Masonic building at the corner of South Courtland and Washington streets in East Stroudsburg, Pennsylvania. The building also housed a Frazetta art museum that displayed both his own work and, in a separate gallery, that of other artists. From 1998 to 1999, Quantum Cat Entertainment published the magazine Frank Frazetta Fantasy Illustrated, with cover art and some illustrations by Frazetta. In his later life, Frazetta was plagued by a variety of health problems, including a thyroid condition that went untreated for many years. A series of strokes left his right arm almost completely paralyzed. He taught himself to paint and draw with his left hand. He was the subject of the 2003 feature film documentary Frank Frazetta: Painting With Fire.

By 2009, Frazetta was living on a  estate in the Pocono Mountains of Pennsylvania, with a small museum that is open to the public. On July 17, 2009, his wife and business partner, Eleanor "Ellie" Frazetta, died after a year-long battle with cancer. He then hired Rob Pistella and Steve Ferzoco to handle his business affairs.

Shortly after Ellie Frazetta's death in December 2009, Frank Frazetta's eldest son Frank Jr. was arrested on charges of stealing $20 million in paintings from the family museum in a fight over the family fortune. According to the police report, Frazetta Jr, with the help of two men, broke through the museum door using a backhoe and took about 90 paintings. According to the affidavit, Frank Jr. told the responding trooper he had permission from the owner, Frank Frazetta Sr....The trooper called the owner, who said he had not given his son permission to either be in the museum or remove paintings from it.
At issue was whether Frank Jr. believed he had the authority to remove the paintings from the Frazetta museum. Frazetta Sr.'s youngest son Bill Frazetta testified that the paintings belonged to a corporation called Frazetta Properties LLC, of which he shared management duties with his sisters. "I am a manager of the LLC. The art was supposed to stay in the museum", Bill Frazetta said. Frank Jr. maintained that he was trying to prevent the paintings from being sold, per the wishes of his father, who he said had given him power of attorney over his estate. Frank Sr. said he did not understand his son's actions. The Frazetta family later issued a statement on April 23, 2010, that said, "all of the litigation surrounding his family and his art has been resolved. All of Frank's children will now be working together as a team to promote his ... collection of images....".

Frank Frazetta died of a stroke on May 10, 2010, in a hospital near his residence in Florida.

His painting Egyptian Queen sold for a world record $5.4 million (£4.2m) on May 16, 2019, at a public auction of vintage comic books and comic art held by Heritage Auctions in Chicago, Illinois.

Accolades
Frazetta was inducted into the comic book industry's Will Eisner Comic Book Hall of Fame in 1995, the Jack Kirby Hall of Fame in 1999. and The Society of Illustrators Hall of Fame in 1998. In 2001, he was awarded a Life Achievement Award from the World Fantasy Convention. And in 2014, Frazetta was inducted into the Science Fiction Hall of Fame, and in 2016 into the Album Cover Hall of Fame. In 2023, Frazetta was inducted into the Inkwell Awards Joe Sinnott Hall of Fame.

Legacy

Frazetta has influenced many artists within the genres of fantasy and science fiction. Filmmaker and creator of Star Wars, George Lucas mentions Frazetta's work in a 1979 article by Alan Arnold stating "I'm a fan of comic art. I collect it. ...There are quite a few [contemporary] illustrators in the science-fiction and science-fantasy modes I like very much. I like them because their designs and imaginations are so vivid. Illustrators like Frazetta, Druillet, and Moebius are quite sophisticated in their style". In 2018, Los Angeles' Lucas Museum of Narrative Art, which is scheduled to complete construction in late 2021, announced it would display four Frazetta originals from Lucas' personal Frazetta collection.

Yusuke Nakano, a lead artist for Nintendo's Legend of Zelda series, also cites Frazetta as an influence.

Oscar-nominated filmmaker Guillermo del Toro said in a 2010 Los Angeles Times article that Frazetta was nothing less than "an Olympian artist that defined fantasy art for the 20th century." Del Toro went on to say "He gave the world a new pantheon of heroes,.... He somehow created a second narrative layer for every book he ever illustrated."

Fantasy artist and musician Joseph Vargo cites Frazetta as a primary influence, and his art calendars since 1998 mark Frazetta's birthday. Chris Perna, art director at Epic Games, stated in an interview in 2011 that Frazetta was one of his influences. Other artists influenced by Frazetta include comics artist such as Marc Silvestri and Shelby Robertson.

Photographer Mark Seliger credits Frazetta for the inspiration of his 2000 portrait photo of Jennifer Lopez.

The face and body paint of professional wrestler Kamala was copied by artist and wrestler Jerry Lawler from a character in a Frazetta painting.

In early 2012, filmmaker Robert Rodriguez announced plans to remake Bakshi and Frazetta's film Fire and Ice. Sony Pictures acquired the project in late 2014, with Rodriguez set to direct. In 2013, Robert Rodriguez displayed Frank Frazetta's original artworks, on loan from the collections of Holly, Heidi, and Bill Frazetta at the Wizard World Comic Con in Chicago. Robert Rodriguez continued his Frazetta artwork tour by showcasing them at the SXSW event in Austin Texas in both 2014 and 2015.

Also reopened solely by Frank Jr in 2013, the East Stroudsburg Frazetta Art Museum which houses roughly 37 original oils, as well as other pencil, pen and ink, and watercolor works.

As of 2013, Holly Frazetta's collection was traveling throughout the U.S. with public showings at comics conventions. She also co-founded Frazetta Girls alongside daughter Sara Frazetta in 2014. The Frazetta Girls company operates as a web store for official Frank Frazetta merchandise, and has a large social media presence for daily postings of Frazetta's work. Since 2014, Frazetta Girls has also collaborated with modern influential brands such as Primitive Skateboarding, Kid Robot, HUF Worldwide, and Mezco Toyz. In March 2020, Holly Frazetta announced the reopening of the Frazetta Art Museum location in Boca Grande, Florida by appointment only, featuring original Conan the Barbarian and Death Dealer works. In February 2022 in collaboration with Incendium Online's Opus Publishing arm, the Frazetta Girls announced "Frank Frazetta's Death Dealer" comic series would return, with Issue #1 released worldwide May 10, 2022, spawning the beginning of the FrazettaVerse.

List of works

Selected paintings
Year and date painted

 Carson of Venus – 1963
 Tales from the Crypt – 1964
 Lost City – 1964
 Land of Terror – 1964
 Reassembled Man – 1964
 Wolfman – 1965
 Conan the Barbarian – 1966
 Conan the Adventurer – 1966
 King Kong – 1966
 Sea Monster – 1966
 Spider Man – 1966
 The Sorcerer – 1966
 Swords of Mars – 1966
 Winged Terror – 1966
 The Brain – 1967
 Bran Mak Morn – 1967
 Cat Girl – 1967
 Conan the Conqueror – 1967
 Conan the Usurper – 1967
 Night Winds – 1967
 Sea Witch – 1967
 Snow Giants – 1967
 Conan the Avenger – 1968
 Rogue Roman – 1968
 Swamp Ogre – 1968
 Egyptian Queen – 1969
 Mongol Tyrant – 1969
 Primitive Beauty / La of Opar – 1969
 Savage World / Young World – 1969
 Vampirella – 1969
 A Princess of Mars – 1970
 Downward to the Earth – 1970
 Eternal Champion – 1970
 The Godmakers – 1970
 Nightstalker – 1970
 Pony Tail – 1970
 The Return of Jongor – 1970
 Sun Goddess – 1970
 Tyrannosaurus Rex – 1970
 Woman with a Scythe – 1970
 Desperation – 1971
 John Carter and the Savage Apes of Mars – 1971
 At the Earth's Core – 1972
 Birdman – 1972
 Creatures of the Night – 1972
 The Silver Warrior – 1972
 Thuvia, Maid of Mars – 1972
 A Fighting Man of Mars – 1973
 Atlantis – 1973
 Black Emperor – 1973
 Black Panther – 1973
 Black Star – 1973
 Conan of Aquilonia – 1973
 The Death Dealer I – 1973
 Flash for Freedom – 1973
 Flying Reptiles – 1973
 Ghoul Queen – 1973
 Gollum – 1973
 The Mammoth – 1973
 Monster Out of Time – 1973
 The Moon Maid – 1973
 Serpent – 1973
 Tanar of Pellucidar – 1973
 Tarzan and the Ant Men – 1973
 Tree of Death – 1973
 Barbarian – 1974
 Flashman on the Charge – 1974
 Invaders – 1974
 Madame Derringer – 1974
 The Mucker – 1974
 Paradox – 1975
 Dark Kingdom – 1976
 Bloodstone – 1975
 Darkness at Times Edge – 1976
 The Eighth Wonder / King Kong and Snake – 1976
 Fire Demon – 1976
 Queen Kong – 1976
 Golden Girl – 1977
 Castle of Sin / Arthur Rex – 1978
 The Cave Demon – 1978
 Kane on the Golden Sea – 1978
 Sound – 1979
 Witherwing – 1979
 The Sacrifice – 1980
 Las Vegas – 1980
 Seven Romans – 1980
 Fire and Ice – 1982
 Geisha – 1983
 The Disagreement – 1986
 Victorious – 1986
 Predators – 1987
 The Death Dealer II – 1987
 The Death Dealer III – 1987
 The Death Dealer IV – 1987
 The Death Dealer V – 1989
 Cat Girl II – 1990
 The Countess and the Greenman – 1991
 Dawn Attack – 1991
 The Moons Rapture / Catwalk – 1994
 Beauty and the Beast – 1995
 Shi – 1995
 The Sorceress – 1995
 The Death Dealer VI – 1996
 From Dusk till Dawn – 1996

Album covers
Source unless otherwise noted:

Movie posters
Source unless otherwise noted:

What's New Pussycat? (1965)
The Secret of My Success (1965)
After the Fox (1966)
Hotel Paradiso (1966)
The Busy Body (1967)
The Fearless Vampire Killers (1967)
Fitzwilly (1967)
Mad Monster Party (1967)
The Night They Raided Minsky's (1968)
Yours, Mine and Ours (1968)
Mrs. Pollifax-Spy (1971)
Luana (1973)
Mixed Company (1974)
The Gauntlet (1977)
Fire and Ice (1983)

References

Sources

Further reading
 Book: Testament: The Life and Art of Frank Frazetta, 
 Movie: Frank Frazetta: Painting with Fire
 Magazine article: "Mr. Fantasy", Circus, November 14, 1978

External links

 
 
 
 Frazetta Art Museum
 Frazetta Girls Corp

1928 births
2010 deaths
20th-century American painters
Album-cover and concert-poster artists
American comics artists
American illustrators
American male painters
American people of Italian descent
American speculative fiction artists
Artists from Brooklyn
EC Comics
Fantasy artists
Film poster artists
Golden Age comics creators
Hugo Award-winning artists
Painters from New York City
Painters from Pennsylvania
Role-playing game artists
Science fiction artists
Science Fiction Hall of Fame inductees
Will Eisner Award Hall of Fame inductees
World Fantasy Award-winning artists